Helen Laupa (born 31 August 1976) is an Estonian former professional tennis player.

Laupa has career-high WTA rankings of 577 in singles, achieved on 26 January 1998, and 403 in doubles, set on 23 December 1996. Playing for the Estonia Fed Cup team, Laupa has a win/loss record of 8–9.

ITF Circuit finals

Doubles: 3 (0–3)

References

External links
 
 
 

1976 births
Living people
Estonian female tennis players